The Ypsilanti Public School District was a public school district in Ypsilanti Township, Michigan, and serving Ypsilanti. Its State of Michigan School District code was 81020. It merged with Willow Run Community Schools and formed Ypsilanti Community Schools in 2013.

History
In the 1940s officials from the federal government of the United States asked the Ypsilanti City School District to annex the Willow Run area, which included the Spencer School District. A referendum was held for voters in the Spencer School District, and Spencer voters rejected the measure on a 3-1 basis despite messages of support for the merger from the Spencer school district parent-teacher organization (PTA) and other area leaders. The Spencer district changed its name to the Willow Run district.

As of the 2006-2007 school year, the Ypsilanti district used the four-tier system composed of Pre-K/K, 1-5, 6-8, and 9-12 Grade Levels that it has used since the 1993-1994 school year. Prior to that, the district used a system composed of Pre-K/K, 1-6, 7-9, and 10-12 Grade Levels since the transition of Perry to a Pre-K/K building.

On June 8, 2009, the YPS school board unanimously passed a resolution to "discuss options for the consideration and sharing of services" with the Lincoln School District, which had passed a similar resolution. Board members also left open the option of incorporating the Willow Run School District into the talks at a future date.

On November 6, 2012, voters in both the Ypsilanti and Willow Run School Districts voted to consolidate the two districts. The two districts became one unified district, Ypsilanti Community Schools, on July 1, 2013. A unified school board, appointed by the Washtenaw Intermediate School District Board of Education, was formed to oversee the transition.

The final day of classes for YPS was Friday June 7, 2013.

Schools

Pre-School/Kindergarten
Perry Child Development Center

Elementary Schools (Grades 1-5)
Adams Math and Science Academy (Closed at the end of 2015/2016 school year)
Erickson Elementary School
Estabrook Elementary School (Grades 2-8)

Middle Schools (Grades 6-8)
Ypsilanti Middle School (formerly West Middle School)
Washtenaw International Middle Academy (formerly East Middle School)

High School (Grades 9-12)
Ypsilanti High School
Ypsilanti STEM Middle College)

Other Schools
New Directions Alternative Education (formerly known as Fletcher Elementary School; named for Elizabeth Fletcher, mother of Harris Fletcher)
Forest Avenue School
Regional Career Technical Center (RCTC)

Former Schools (Currently closed)
George Elementary School (most recently known as George Multiage Academy)
Chapelle Community School (formerly Chapelle Elementary School)

Notes

External links
 Ypsilanti Public School District Website (Archive)

Ypsilanti, Michigan
Former school districts in Michigan
Education in Washtenaw County, Michigan
School districts disestablished in 2013